Rufus Greene (May 30, 1707 - December 31, 1777) was a noted American silversmith, and subsequently a wealthy Loyalist merchant, active in colonial Boston, Massachusetts.

Greene was apprenticed to William Cowell Sr., married Katherine Stanbridge on December 10, 1728, and worked from 1728 to 1749 as a silversmith. His account book notes: "I Began or Sett up my Bisness October the 7:1728 and the Making of the things from that time to January the 1:1732 Came to £1624..6..0." Together with his brother, Benjamin, he gradually expanded his interests as a land speculator and general merchant. By 1749, deeds and contracts identify him as a merchant, though he may have sometimes continued to produce silver pieces. His daughter, Katharine Greene Amory, is known for the journal she kept during the American Revolution.

References 
 Guide to the Winterthur Library: The Joseph Downs Collection and the Winterthur Archives, Joseph Downs Collection of Manuscripts & Printed Ephemera, Winterthur Library, 2003, page 237.
 Historic Silver of the Colonies and Its Makers, Francis Hill Bigelow, Macmillan, 1917, page 403.
 American Silversmiths

American silversmiths